The Garrett Farmstead is an historic farmhouse which is located in Willistown Township, Chester County, Pennsylvania.

History and architectural features
Constructed by Isaac and Amos Garrett near Ridley Creek circa 1802, this former farmstead of Aaron Garrett served as the headquarters for Okehocking Nature Center until 2016 and is owned by the Willistown Township. Ruins comprising the stone foundation of a historic barn are located nearby. 

The Garrett Farmstead was listed on the National Register of Historic Places on February 27, 2003.

See also 
 National Register of Historic Places listings in eastern Chester County, Pennsylvania

References 

Houses on the National Register of Historic Places in Pennsylvania
Houses completed in 1802
Houses in Chester County, Pennsylvania
National Register of Historic Places in Chester County, Pennsylvania
1802 establishments in Pennsylvania
Colonial architecture in Pennsylvania
Second Empire architecture in Pennsylvania
Farmhouses in the United States